The Mask of Horror is a 1912 short silent French horror film directed by Abel Gance and starring Édouard de Max.

Cast
 Édouard de Max
 Charles de Rochefort
 Florelle (as Mlle Rousseau)
 Mathilde Thizeau
 Jean Toulout as Ermont

References

External links

1912 films
1912 horror films
1912 short films
1910s French-language films
French horror films
French silent short films
French black-and-white films
Films directed by Abel Gance
Lost horror films
Lost French films
1912 lost films
Silent horror films
1910s French films